Three ships of the Royal Fleet Auxiliary have borne the name RFA Bayleaf:

 RFA Bayleaf was an oiler, previously the civilian vessel Cevic. She was bought in 1914 and used as a dummy vessel to imitate the battlecruiser . In 1915 she was converted to an oiler and renamed RFA Bayol, . She was renamed Bayleaf in 1917 and sold to Royal Dutch Shell in 1920.
  was an  tanker, built as the civilian London Integrity for London & Overseas Freighters in 1955. She was bareboat chartered in 1959 and returned to her owners in 1973.
  is a Leaf-class tanker chartered in 1982 and decommissioned in 2011.

Royal Fleet Auxiliary ship names